Sofiane Tergou (born 3 September 1991) is a French footballer.

Career
After two seasons in France with US Sarre-Union, Tergou moved to the United States to attend Southern New Hampshire University, where he would continue his studies after attending the University of Strasbourg.

While playing at SNHU, Tergou played with Premier Development League side Seacoast United Phantoms in 2015.

Tergou signed with United Soccer League side Rochester Rhinos on 14 May 2016.

References

External links

1991 births
Living people
French footballers
French expatriate footballers
US Sarre-Union players
Southern New Hampshire Penmen men's soccer players
Seacoast United Phantoms players
Rochester New York FC players
Association football midfielders
Expatriate soccer players in the United States
USL League Two players
USL Championship players
French sportspeople of Algerian descent
French expatriate sportspeople in the United States
Footballers from Strasbourg
University of Strasbourg alumni